Alphamenes campanulatus is a species of wasp in the family Vespidae. It was described by Johan Christian Fabricius in 1804.

References

Vespidae
Insects described in 1804